The following is a list of professional and amateur theatres and theatre companies in Budapest, Hungary. They are organised alphabetically in name order.

B
Bárka Theatre
Budapest Puppet Theatre

C
Chamber Theatre of Budapest
Cellar Theatre
Centrál Theatre
Comedy Theatre of Budapest

D
Deutsches Theater Budapest
Duma Theatre

E
Erkel Theatre

H
Hétfőszín
Hungarian State Opera House

I
International Buda Stage

J
Játékszín
József Attila Theatre

K
Karinthy Theatre
Katona József Theatre
Kolibri Theatre
Komédium
Korona Pódium
Körúti Theatre
Krétakör Theatre

M
Madách Chamber
Madách Theatre
Magyar Theatre
Maskara Társulat
Merlin International Theatre
MiaManó Theatre
Mikroszkóp Színpad
Millenáris Theatrum
MU Theatre
Musical Theatre

N
Nap Theatre
National Dance Theatre
National Theatre

O
Operett Theatre of Budapest
Örkény István Theatre

P
Pesti Vigadó

R
Radnóti Miklós Theatre
Ruttkai Éva Theatre

S
Szabad-Tér Theatre

T
Thália Theatre
Trafó House of Contemporary Arts
Tropicarium Theatre

U
Uncle Lakner's Children Theatre
Új Theatre

V
Városi Theatre
Vidám Színpad

See also
 List of theatres in Hungary

Theatre in Hungary
Budapest
Theatres, Budapest
Theatres